Psidium rufum is commonly known as the purple guava. It is endemic to Brazil and bears an edible fruit. Psidium rufum var. widgrenianum is listed on the IUCN Red List vulnerable species (Plantae).

References

rufum
Endemic flora of Brazil
IUCN Red List vulnerable species
Plants described in 1828